Alexander Vassilievich Golubintzev  (February 28, 1882 – April 19, 1963) was member of the Imperial Russian Army. He joined the army during the Russo-Japanese War in 1904. He was a colonel in the army when the Russian Revolution of 1917 broke out in 1917. He became a Major General in the Don Army and the Armed Forces of South Russia and one of the leaders of the counterrevolutionary White movement.

At the start of World War I he was a colonel and commander of the 3rd Don Cavalry Regiment(:ru:Донской 3-й казачий полк). as well a military commander and organizer of the 4st Cossack Volunteer Cavalry Regiment at the stanitsa Ust-Khoperskaya. He joined the March on Moscow of General Konstantin Mamontov as a commander of the 5th Don Cavalry Division and later fled in exile to Bulgaria, Germany, and the United States. He died on April 19, 1963, in Cleveland, Ohio.

Writings 
 Golubintzev, A.V., «Russian Vandea», 1995

See also
 Don Army
 Don Republic
 Volunteer Army
 Russian Civil War

References

 Valeri Klawing, Konstantin K. Mamantov: Civil War in Russia. White movement armies. M., 2003
 Volkov S.V.: White movement in Russia: Organisation and structure. 2000  http://swolkov.ru/bdorg/bdorg20.htm#1329
 Alexander V. Golubintzev on Hrono.ru http://hrono.ru/biograf/bio_g/golubincev.html

1882 births
1963 deaths
Cossacks from the Russian Empire
Don Cossacks
Anti-communists from the Russian Empire
Recipients of the Order of St. Anna
White Russian emigrants to the United States
Russian Provisional Government generals
Russian people of World War I
People of the Russian Civil War
White movement generals
Writers from the Russian Empire